Salvia tricuspis is an annual or biennial plant that is native to Sichuan, Gansu, Shaanxi, and Shanxi  provinces in China, found growing in foothills, riverbanks, streamsides, and grasslands at  elevation.

Inflorescences are 2-4 flowered widely spaced verticillasters.

Notes

tricuspis
Flora of China